Polo Creek is a stream in the U.S. state of South Dakota.

Polo Creek heads near Polo Peak, from which it takes its creative name.

See also
List of rivers of South Dakota

References

Rivers of Lawrence County, South Dakota
Rivers of South Dakota